Stanley William Gough  (7 January 1914 – 30 January 1991) was an Australian politician.

He was elected to the Tasmanian House of Assembly in 1969 as a Liberal member for Franklin. He was defeated at the next election in 1972. Gough was awarded an MBE in 1986.

References

1914 births
1991 deaths
Liberal Party of Australia members of the Parliament of Tasmania
Members of the Tasmanian House of Assembly
Members of the Order of the British Empire